Roadside America may refer to:

 Roadside America, an indoor miniature village and railway in Shartlesville, Pennsylvania created by Laurence Gieringer in 1935
 Roadside America, a travel book series by American author Doug Kirby

See also
 Roadside attraction